Glazebrook can refer to:
Glazebrook, a village near Warrington in Cheshire, England
Glazebrook railway station
Rixton-with-Glazebrook, English civil parish
10099 Glazebrook, an outer main-belt asteroid named after Karl Glazebrook

People with surname Glazebrook
Bob Glazebrook (born 1956), U.S. football player
Harriet A. Glazebrook (1847–1937), English author and temperance movement activist 
Hugh de Twenbrokes Glazebrook (1855-1937), British painter, brother of Michael George Glazebrook
Karl Glazebrook (born 1965), Anglo-Australian astronomer
Michael George Glazebrook (1853–1926), British educator and athlete
Otis Allan Glazebrook (1845 - 1931), Episcopal priest, U.S. Consul, founder of Alpha Tau Omega
Philip Glazebrook (1880–1918), British politician
Sir Richard Glazebrook (1854–1935), English physicist

Susan Glazebrook (born 1956), New Zealand judge

See also
Glaze Brook, a river in the North West of England